Milena Calderón Sol de Escalón, is a Salvadoran politician, first female mayoress of Santa Ana since 1 May 2018. She was member of the Legislative Assembly of El Salvador between 1991 and 2018 for the Nationalist Republican Alliance (ARENA).
She is sister of former President, Armando Calderón Sol.

External links

References

Living people
People from Santa Ana, El Salvador
Nationalist Republican Alliance politicians
Women mayors of places in El Salvador
Members of the Legislative Assembly of El Salvador
20th-century Salvadoran women politicians
20th-century Salvadoran politicians
21st-century Salvadoran women politicians
21st-century Salvadoran politicians
Year of birth missing (living people)
Sol family